De Courcy Lewthwaite Dewar (12 February 1878 – 24 November 1959) was a decorative metalwork designer, and member of the Glasgow Girls group of artists during the 1890/1900s.

Early life 
Dewar was born on 12 February 1878 in Kandy, Sri Lanka, which was then known as British Ceylon. Her father was a tea planter called John Lewthwaite Dewar and her mother was Amelia Cochrane. Her unusual first name is a family name, although she was also known by the pet name of Kooroovi, meaning small bird in Tamil. Dewar's sister Margaret Cochrane Dewar studied at Queen Margaret's Collage in Glasgow.  Becoming one of the first woman in Glasgow to graduate in Medicine  in 1894.

Career 

Dewar studied enamel and metalwork at Glasgow School of Art from 1891 until 1908 or 1909. She was taught metalwork by Peter Wylie Davidson. Her work was often illustrated in The Studio magazine. For thirty-eight years, De Courcy taught at Glasgow School of Art, being appointed instructor of enamels by Fra Newbery. She worked alongside fellow artists Ann Macbeth, Jessie M. King, Dorothy Carleton Smyth, Jean Delville, Peter Wylie Davidson, and Kellock Brown. She instituted the Dewar Prize for enamels to be awarded at the Annual Exhibition of the Glasgow School of Art Club. She had a studio at Central Chamber, 93 Hope Street, Glasgow, where she worked independently from 1900 - 1926. After 1926, she continued to work in a studio at her home at 15 Woodside Terrace, Glasgow

Some of her decorative metalwork pieces were used for illustration in Applied Design in Precious Metals, a publication by her colleague Peter Wylie Davidson. Her enamel work was exhibited at the Scottish Section of the Prima Esposizione Internazionale d'Arte Decorativa Moderna in Turin in 1902.

Dewar was involved with the women's suffrage movement. She designed a banner for the Women's Freedom League in 1908. It was decorated in "flaming red" with the words "Save the Bill". She also designed a banner for Glasgow and West of Scotland Association for Women's Suffrage in 1911 for use at the coronation of George V in London for a fee of 30 shillings.  This banner, stating 'Let Glasgow Flourish' is now held at the Glasgow Museums Resource Centre in Glasgow.

Dewar and her friend operated a house for destitute women in the Bellshill , called Harkness House, which the Prince of Wales visited in the 1930s.  footage of De Courcy at the opening can be viewed online on the National Library of Scotland website, this maybe the only footage there is of Glasgow suffragettes. 

She wrote the History of the Glasgow Society of Lady Artists' Club, published in 1950.   While writing this she was the President of the Glasgow Society of Lady Artists, she became President  in 1934 and remained in this post until 1937, In 1936 she won the Lauder prize. The society now known as the Glasgow Society of Women Artists.  

De Courcy lived with her sister, Katharine, at 15 Woodside Terrace, Glasgow, until her death.

See also
 List of Scottish women artists
 The Glasgow Girls

References

External links 
 Archive footage for the National Library of Scotland
 Archive items held by Glasgow University which mention De Courcy Lewthwaite Dewar

1878 births
1959 deaths
20th-century Scottish women artists
Academics of the Glasgow School of Art
Alumni of the Glasgow School of Art
British people in British Ceylon
Scottish silversmiths